Ubisoft Singapore Pte. Ltd. is a Singaporean video game developer and studio of Ubisoft based at Fusionopolis. The studio was founded in 2008 and has contributed to the majority of Assassin's Creed games. It is currently leading the development of their upcoming title Skull and Bones, which is set to release in March 2023.

History
Ubisoft Singapore is a development studio based in Singapore that was established in 2008 by French video game company Ubisoft. The studio was founded by a small team who were working at the company's Paris headquarters. They had a goal to effort to initiate a game-production network in the most rapidly developing parts of southeast Asia. The studio is located at Fusionopolis, a research and development complex in the one-north district. Singapore's openness to international business, the availability of staff trained in software development, and the popularity of the emerging free-to-play and mobile game markets in Asia were key factors in Ubisoft's decision to open a studio in the country. The studio works closely with DigiPen's international campus in Singapore on a program to foster local talent for video game development. Ubisoft Singapore operates with multiple teams working on different projects simultaneously.

In 2017, the studio was still headed by its initial leadership team and had grown to over 300 employees. Former members of studio established other Ubisoft operations in southeast Asia, including Ubisoft Philippines and Ubisoft Chengdu. As of July 2018, the studio employs 350 people led by Hugues Ricour, who serves as managing director for Ubisoft Singapore and sister studio Ubisoft Philippines.

Ubisoft Singapore was one of several studios that were included in the larger reports of sexual harassment and discrimination within the whole of Ubisoft starting in 2020; Ricour stepped down as managing director as part of Ubisoft's internal reviews from these allegations but remained with the studio in November 2020. Following a July 2021 report from Kotaku regarding sexual harassment and workplace discrimination within the studio, Singapore's Tripartite Alliance for Fair and Progressive Employment Practices began its own investigation into the studio in August 2021.

Games
Ubisoft Singapore's first project was Teenage Mutant Ninja Turtles: Turtles in Time Re-Shelled (2009), a remake of an existing arcade game. After the success of 2007's Assassin's Creed, Ubisoft began devoting more resources to its 2009 sequel with the intention of elevating Assassin's Creed to be the company's flagship series. This created an opportunity for Ubisoft Singapore to contribute to Assassin's Creed 2s development by producing assets and designing the game's linear challenges. Several members of staff who worked on the first Assassin's Creed game moved to the Singapore to provide the team with some experience. As Ubisoft Singapore continued working on the series, they were granted with more responsibility, which led them to take charge of more distinctive parts of the games, including the naval combat in 2012's Assassin's Creed III. The studio has worked on every Assassin's Creed title since the second game, including major contributions to Unity (2014), Syndicate (2015), and Origins (2017).

The studio's softography also includes Tom Clancy's Ghost Recon Phantoms, a free-to-play, microtransaction-supported tactical shooter that launched in 2012 but was closed down 2016. The studio is leading development on the upcoming naval warfare game Skull and Bones, which is set to release on March 9, 2023.

Games developed

References

External links
 

Ubisoft divisions and subsidiaries
Video game development companies
Video game companies established in 2008
Singaporean companies established in 2008
Video game companies of Singapore